Buis-les-Baronnies (Vivaro-Alpine: Lo Bois dei Baroniás) is a commune in the Drôme department in southeastern France.

Geography
Buis-les-Baronnies is located on the right bank of the river Ouvèze (Buis-les-Baronnies as a town has limits on the other bank).

Population

See also
Baronnies
Communes of the Drôme department

References

Communes of Drôme